James Johnston House may refer to:

James Johnston House (Half Moon Bay, California), listed on the National Register of Historic Places in San Mateo County, California
James Johnston House (Brentwood, Tennessee), NRHP-listed

See also
Johnston House (disambiguation)